Carolyn Longton (born 21 May 1965) is one of the co-founders, in 1999, of Mumsnet.

Early life
She grew up in Blackpool, where her father was a headmaster. She has an older sister. She attended the independent Elmslie School in Blackpool, which closed in 2000. She studied English at St Anne's College, Oxford.

Career

Television
She worked at Pebble Mill Studios. She moved to the BBC at London. She worked as a television producer,

Mumsnet
She helped found Mumsnet in 1999.

Personal life
She met her husband at Oxford. She has three children.

References

External links
 BBC Woman's Hour

1965 births
Alumni of St Anne's College, Oxford
BBC 100 Women
British technology company founders
British television producers
British women television producers
People from Blackpool
Living people